Jennifer, also spelled Jenifer or Jenefer, is a feminine given name, the Cornish form of Guinevere, that became popular in the English-speaking world in the 20th century.

History 
"Jennifer" may mean "the fair one" (from Proto-Celtic “Windo-*sēbro ” (cognate with Old Irish síabar "a spectre, phantom, supernatural being [usually in pejorative sense]").A Cornish form, it is cognate with the Welsh form Gwenhwyfar and with the Old Irish Findabair. Despite the name's similarity to the Old English words "jenefer," "genefer," and "jinifer," these appear to be derived from the juniper plant used to flavor the beverage.

A common first name for females in English-speaking countries during the 20th century, the name Jennifer has been in use since the 18th century. Before 1906, the name was fairly uncommon, but it gained some recognition after George Bernard Shaw used it for the main female character in The Doctor's Dilemma. However, United Kingdom government statistics (covering England and Wales) only show the name first entering the top 100 most commonly used names for baby girls in 1934 – 28 years after the play was first staged, but it thereafter rose in popularity somewhat, peaking at No. 11 in 1984. Jennifer remained in the top 100 in England and Wales until 2005. It was ranked No. 166 in 2009.

In the United States, the name Jennifer first entered the annual government-derived list of the 1,000 most commonly used names for newborn baby girls in 1938, when it ranked at No. 987. Thereafter, the name steadily gained popularity, entering the top 100 most commonly given girls names in 1956 and breaking through into the top 10 in 1966. It gained even more popularity in the 1970s, possibly due to its use in the movie Love Story. Jennifer was the single most popular name for newborn girls in the United States every year from 1970 to 1984 (until 1985 in Delaware, Illinois and Massachusetts), inclusive. It dropped out of the top 10 in the United States in 1992 and out of the top 100 in 2009. It has remained among the top 1,000 names in use for American girls and, as of 2021, was ranked in 492nd position on the Social Security Administration’s list of most used names for newborn girls. It has also been well used in other European and North American countries.

Notable people 
 Jenifer (born 1982), French singer and actress
 Jennifer Aaker (born 1967), American social psychologist and Professor of Marketing
 Jennifer Abbott (born 1965), Canadian film director
 Jennifer Abel (born 1991), Canadian diver
 Jennifer Abod (born 1946), American feminist activist, musician, journalist, and filmmaker
 Jennifer Abruzzo, American attorney and politician
 Jennifer Ackerman (born 1959), American author
 Jennifer Ahern (born 1978), American epidemiologist
 Jennifer Åkerman (born 1989), Swedish model, blogger and singer
 Jennifer Alanyo, Ugandan physician, military officer, and politician
 Jennifer Alexander (1972–2007), Canadian ballet dancer
 Jennifer Lucy Allan, British writer, researcher, and radio presenter
 Jennifer Allen (born 1961), American author and commentator
 Jennifer Alley, American basketball coach
 Jennifer Alleyn (born 1969), Canadian artist, filmmaker, writer, and photographer
 Jennifer Allison (born 1966), American author
 Jennifer Anderson, British diplomat
 Jennifer Angus (born 1961), Canadian artist, professor, and author
 Jennifer Aniston (born 1969), American actress, producer and businesswoman
 Jennifer Anson (born 1977), American-Palaun judoka
 Jennifer Antony, Indian actress and model
 Jennifer Archer (born 1957), American author
 Jennifer Arcuri (born 1985), American technology entrepreneur
 Jennifer Arias (born 1987), Colombian politician
 Jennifer Armintrout (born 1980), American author
 Jennifer Armour (born 1985), American actress and voice artist
 Jennifer Armstrong (born 1961), American children's writer
 Jennifer Armstrong (born 1992), Canadian curler
 Jennifer Arndt, American politician
 Jennifer Arroyo (born 1975), American bassist
 Jennifer Arveláez (born 1982), Venezuelan athlete
 Jennifer Ashton (born 1969), American physician, author and television correspondent
 Jennifer Aspen (born 1973), American actress
 Jennifer Aylmer (born 1972), American operatic soprano
 Jennifer Ayoo, Ugandan politician
 Jennifer Azzi (born 1968), American basketball coach
 Jennifer Baichwal (born 1965), Canadian documentary filmmaker, writer and producer
 Jennifer Balakrishnan, American mathematician
 Jennifer Margaret Barker (born 1965), Scottish-American classical composer
 Jennifer Barnhart (born 1972), American actress and puppeteer
 Jennifer Bartlett (1941–2022), American artist
 Jennifer Batten (born 1957), American guitarist
 Jennifer Baumgardner (born 1970), American writer, activist and filmmaker
 Jennifer Beals (born 1963), American actress and former teen model
 Jen Beattie (born 1991), Scottish footballer
 Jennifer Bendery (born 1974), American political journalist
 Jenifer Benítez (born 1988), Spanish diver
 Jennifer Berman, American sexual health expert, urologist, and female sexual medicine specialist
 Jennifer Betit Yen (born 1986), American actress, lawyer, producer and writer
 Jennifer Blake (born 1983), Canadian professional wrestler
 Jennifer Blanc (born 1974), American actress
 Jennifer Blow (born 1991), Australian goalball player
 Jennifer Bolande (born 1957), American artist
 Jennifer Botterill (born 1979), Canadian former women's hockey player
 Jennifer Finney Boylan (born 1958), American author, reality television personality and transgender activist
 Jennifer Brady (born 1995), American tennis player
 Jenifer Branning (born 1979), American lawyer and politician
 Jennifer Braun (born 1991), German singer
 Jennifer Brea, American documentary filmmaker and activist
 Jenifer Brening (born 1996), German singer
 Jennifer Brewin, Canadian theatre creator and artistic director
 Jennifer Bricker (born 1987), American acrobat and aerialist
 Jennifer Brown (born 1972), Swedish singer
 Jennifer Brozek (born 1970), American freelance author
 Jennifer Brunner (born 1957), American attorney, politician and judge
 Jennifer Byrne (born 1966), Australian Professor of Molecular Oncology at University of Sydney
 Jennifer Camper (born 1957), Lebanese-American cartoonist and graphic artist
 Jennifer Capriati (born 1976), American former world No. 1 tennis player
 Jennifer Carnahan (born 1976), American political operative
 Jennifer Carpenter (born 1979), American actress
 Jennifer Carroll (born 1959), Trinidadian-American Republican politician and retired naval officer
 Jennifer Carroll Foy (born 1981), American lawyer and politician
 Jennifer Carroll MacNeill (born 1980), Irish Fine Gael politician
 Jennifer Celotta (born 1971), American television producer, writer and director
 Jennifer Anne Chappill (1959–2006), Australian botanist
 Jennifer Charles (born 1968), American singer, poet and writer
 Jennifer Clement (born 1960), American-Mexican author
 Jennifer Cody (born 1969), American actress and dancer
 Jennifer Cohen (born 1976), Canadian fitness personality
 Jennifer Condos, American bass guitarist
 Jennifer Connelly (born 1970), American actress
 Jennifer Cook O'Toole (born 1975), American author and public speaker
 Jennifer Coolidge (born 1961), American actress
 Jennifer Corday (born 1966), American singer
 Jennifer Elise Cox (born 1969), American actress
 Jennifer Crittenden (born 1969), American screenwriter and producer
 Jennifer Crocker, American Professor of Social Psychology at Ohio State University
 Jennifer Crusie (born Jennifer Smith; 1949), American author of contemporary romance novels
 Jennifer Dahlgren (born 1984), Argentine hammer thrower
 Jennifer Dale (born 1956), Canadian actress and former dancer
 Jennifer Damiano (born 1991), American actress and singer
 Jennifer Darling (born 1946), American voice, film and television actress
 Jennifer Decilveo, American record producer and songwriter
 Jennifer Decker (born 1982), French actress
 Jennifer Des (born 1975), Belgian photographer
 Jennifer Dickson (born 1936), South African-born British photographer
 Jennifer Dionne, American scientist and pioneer of nanophotonics
 Jennifer A. Di Toro (born 1967), American judge
 Jennifer Dixon, British chief executive of the Health Foundation
 Jennifer Dodds (born 1991), Scottish curler
 Jennifer Doleac, American economist
 Jennifer Don (born 1984), Taiwanese-American figure skater
 Jennifer Donahue, American political analyst
 Jennifer Donnelly (born 1963), American young adult fiction writer
 Jennifer A. Dorsey (born 1971), American attorney and jurist
 Jennifer Doudna (born 1964), American biochemist
 Jennifer Dougherty (born 1961), American mayoress
 Jennifer Douglas (born 1964), American writer, producer and activist
 Jennifer Dowd, American social scientist
 Jennifer duBois (born 1983), American novelist
 Jennifer Dunn (1941–2007), American politician and engineer
 Jennifer Eberhardt (born 1965), American social psychologist
 Jennifer Echols, American writer of romantic fiction for young adults
 Jennifer Edwards (born 1957), American actress
 Jennifer Egan (born 1962), American novelist and short-story writer
 Jennifer Egelryd (born 1990), Swedish football forward
 Jennifer Ehle (born 1969), English-American actress
 Jennifer Elie (born 1986), American professional tennis player
 Jennifer Eliogu (born 1976), Nigerian actress and singer
 Jennifer Elisseeff (born 1973), American biomedical engineer, ophthalmologist and academic
 Jennifer Ellison (born 1983), English actress, television personality, dancer, singer and former glamour model
 Jennifer Elster, American experimental artist, filmmaker, writer, photographer, musician and performer
 Jennifer Elvgren, American author and journalist
 Jennifer England (born 1978), American model and actress
 Jennifer Esposito (born 1973), American actress and author
 Jennifer Estep, American author of urban fantasy and paranormal romance novels
 Jenifer Estess (1963–2003), American theatre producer
 Jennifer Euston (born 1974), American casting director
 Jennifer Fallon (born 1959), Australian author of fantasy and science fiction
 Jennifer Faunce (born 1965), American politician and judge
 Jennifer Ferrin (born 1979), American actress
 Jennifer Fichter (born 1984), American convicted criminal
 Jennifer Finch (born 1966), American musician, designer and photographer
 Jennifer Finlayson-Fife, American psychologist, sexuality educator and clinical professional counsellor
 Jennifer Finnigan (born 1979), Canadian actress
 Jennifer Fisher, American jewellery designer
 Jennifer Flackett, American film director and screenwriter
 Jennifer Flavin (born 1968), American entrepreneur, businesswoman, former model and wife of Sylvester Stallone
 Jennifer Flay (born 1959), New Zealand director of the Fiac
 Jennifer Fleiss, co-founder of Rent the Runway
 Jennifer Crystal Foley (born 1973), American actress
 Jennifer Fonstad, American venture capital investor and entrepreneur
 Jennifer Foster, English scholar of prehistoric and medieval archaeology
 Jennifer Fox, American film producer
 Jennifer Fox (born 1959), American film producer, director, writer and cinematographer
 Jennifer Francis, American senior scientist at Woods Hole Research Center
 Jennifer Freeman (born 1985), American actress
 Jennifer Freyd (born 1957), American researcher, author, educator and public speaker
 Jennifer Fry (born 1989), South African badminton player
 Jennifer Garner (born 1972), American actress and producer
 Jennifer E. Glick, American sociologist and social demographer
 Jennifer Eaton Gökmen (born 1971), American writer and editor
 Jennifer Granholm (born 1959), Canadian-American politician, lawyer, educator and author
 Jennifer Grey (born 1960), American actress
 Jennifer Caron Hall (born 1958), English actress, singer and journalist
 Jenifer Hart (1914–2005), English academic and senior civil servant
 Jennifer Hawkins (born 1983), American model, television presenter, beauty pageant titleholder, and Miss Universe 2004
 Jennifer Michael Hecht (born 1965), American teacher, author, poet and historian
 Jennifer M. Heemstra, Professor of Chemistry at Emory University
 Jennifer Hermoso (born 1990), Spanish footballer
 Jennifer Love Hewitt (born 1979), American actress, producer, and singer
 Jennifer A. Hillman (born 1957), American lawyer and professor
 Jennifer A. Hoeting, American statistician
 Jennifer F. M. Horne (died 2008), Kenyan ornithologist and bioacoustician
 Jennifer Hudson (born 1981), American singer and actress
 Jennifer Irwin (born 1975), Canadian actress
 Jennifer A. Johnson, American Assistant Professor of Sociology at Virginia Commonwealth University
 Jennifer Jones (1919–2009), American actress and mental health advocate
 Jennifer Kluska, American film director
 Jennifer Lawrence (born 1990), American actress
 Jennifer Lee (born 1971), American screenwriter, film director and chief creative officer and Walt Disney Animation Studios
 Jennifer Jason Leigh (born 1962), American actress and producer
 Jenifer Lewis (born 1957), American actress, comedian, singer and activist
 Jennifer A. Lewis (born 1964), American materials scientist and engineer
 Jennifer Lopez (born 1969), American singer, actress, producer and dancer
 Jennifer D. Luff, American historian of 20th century politics
 Jennifer Macdonald, American conceptual artist
 Jennifer Maia (born 1988), Brazilian professional mixed martial artist
 Jennifer Maiden (born 1949), Australian poet
 Jennifer Maidman (born 1958), British musician, singer, producer and actress
 Jennifer Marohasy (born 1963), Australian biologist, columnist and blogger
 Jennifer Martínez (born 1971), American human rights lawyer
 Jennifer McClellan (born 1972), American politician
 Jennifer McFalls (born 1971), American Olympic softball player
 Jennifer McIntosh (born 1991), Scottish sports shooter and fantasy author
 Jennifer C. McIntosh, American hydrogeologist and Professor of Hydrology and Atmospheric Sciences
 Jennifer Mee (born 1991), better known as "Hiccup Girl", American woman with a long-lasting case of the hiccups
 Jennifer Metcalfe (born 1983), English actress
 Jennifer Meyer (born 1977), American jewellery designer
 Jennifer Monson (born 1961), American dancer and choreographer
 Jennifer Morgan (born 1971), American technology executive
 Jennifer Morla (born 1955), American graphic designer
 Jennifer Morrison (born 1979), American actress, director, producer and former child model
 Jennifer Moss (1945–2006), English actress and singer
 Jennifer Sheridan Moss, American papyrologist
 Jennifer Moyle (1921–2016), British biochemist
 Jennifer Murphy (born 1979), American Internet personality and former beauty pageant contestant
 Jennifer Musisi, Ugandan lawyer and public administrator
 Jennifer E. Nashold, American attorney
 Jenifer Neils (born 1950), American classical archaeologist
 Jennifer Nettles (born 1974), American singer, actress and record producer
 Jennifer A. Nielsen (born 1971), American author
 Jennifer Padilla (born 1990), Colombian track and field athlete
 Jennifer Pan (born 1986), Vietnamese-Canadian killer
 Jenifer Papararo (born 1966), Canadian curator and writer of contemporary art
 Jenifer Rajkumar (born 1982), American politician and lawyer
 Jennifer Anne Reddall (born 1975), American prelate bishop
 Jennifer Clyburn Reed, American businessperson and schoolteacher
 Jennifer Diane Reitz (born 1959), American writer, webcomic author and game designer
 Jennifer Ramírez Rivero (1978–2018), Venezuelan model and businesswoman
 Jennifer Rice, Canadian politician
 Jenifer Rice-Genzuk Henry, American screenwriter and former singer
 Jennifer Richeson (born 1972), American social psychologist
 Jenifer Ringer (born 1972/1973), American ballet dancer and educator
 Jennifer Risper (born 1987), American professional basketball player
 Jennifer Rivera, American mezzo-soprano
 Jennifer Rowe (born 2 October 1955), British civil servant
 Jennifer Ash Rudick (born 1963), American journalist, author, and filmmaker
 Jennifer Saunders (born 1958), English actress, comedian and screenwriter
 Jennifer Speake (born 1944), Canadian-British freelance writer and editor
 Jennifer E. Smith (born 1980), American author of young adult novels
 Jennifer Elaine Smith, behavioural ecologist and evolutionary biologist
 Jennifer Anne Thomas, British physicist
 Jennifer Tilly (born 1958), American-Canadian actress and poker player
 Jennifer Westfeldt (born 1970), American actress, screenwriter, director and producer
 Jenifer Widjaja (born 1986), Brazilian professional tennis player
 Jennifer Winget (born 1985), Indian actress
 Jenifer K. Wofford, American contemporary artist

Fictional characters 

 Jennifer Aldridge, character on the British soap opera, The Archers
 Jennifer Armstrong, character in the British novel, Five Run Away Together
 Jennifer Baylor, a protagonist in the horror film Jennifer
 Jennifer Check, character in the horror comedy film, Jennifer's Body
 Jennifer Parker, a character in the science fiction comedy franchise movie Back to the Future
 Jennifer "Jen" Scott, the pink ranger in the Power Rangers Time Force
 Jennifer Shope, one of the protagonists of Supernoobs

See also 

 
 Jenna
 Jenny
 Society for Preventing Parents from Naming Their Children Jennifer

References 

Cornish language
Celtic given names
Given names
English feminine given names